Raymond Jones (3 February 1926 – 22 April 2000) was a member of the Queensland Legislative Assembly.

Biography
Jones was born in Cairns, Queensland, the son of David Jones and his wife Dorothy Edith (née Soilleux). He was educated at Parramatta State School and St Augustines College, both in Cairns. He joined the 51st Battalion Regiment Cadets in 1940 serving with them for a year and in 1942 he was a member of the Volunteer Defence Corps for a year. From 1943 until 1945 he was an air crew trainee with the RAAF. After the war he worked for the Queensland Railways as a porter, shunter and guard.

On 15 October 1949 Jones married Fay Hazel Brown (died 2008) and together had two sons and a daughter. He died in April 2000 and was buried in the Martyn Street Cemetery.

Public career
Jones started out in politics as an alderman on the Cairns City Council from 1964 to 1965. When the member for Cairns, Watty Wallace, died in 1964, Jones won the subsequent by-election held in February the next year. He went on to represent the electorate for over 18 years before retiring in 1983.

Although he was always in opposition during his state political career, Jones held several roles:
 Opposition spokesman on Aboriginal Advancement 1974-1977
 Opposition Whip 1977-1981
 Member of the Parliamentary Building Committee 1966-1968
 Temporary Chairman of Committees 1969-1970
 Shadow Minister for Transport and Road Safety 1970-1977
 Member of the Parliamentary Printing Committee 1974-1977
 Member of the Parliamentary Delegation to South-East Asia 1974
 Alternate Delegate to the Australian Constitutional Convention in Perth 1978 
 Member of the Select Committee of Privileges 1978
 Shadow Minister for Maritime Services and Tourism 1977

References

1926 births
2000 deaths
Australian Labor Party members of the Parliament of Queensland
Members of the Queensland Legislative Assembly
20th-century Australian politicians